Brain Research is a peer-reviewed scientific journal focusing on several aspects of neuroscience. It publishes research reports and "minireviews". The editor-in-chief is Matthew J. LaVoie (University of Florida).

Until 2011, full reviews were published in Brain Research Reviews, which is now integrated into the main section, albeit with independent volume numbering. In 2006, four other previously established semi-independent journal sections (Cognitive Brain Research, Developmental Brain Research, Molecular Brain Research, and Brain Research Protocols) were merged with Brain Research.

The journal has nine main subsections:
 Cellular and Molecular  Systems
 Nervous System Development, Regeneration and Aging
 Neurophysiology, Neuropharmacology and other forms of Intercellular Communication
 Structural Organization of the Brain
 Sensory and Motor Systems
 Regulatory Systems
 Cognitive and Behavioral Neuroscience
 Disease-Related Neuroscience
 Computational and Theoretical Neuroscience

According to the Journal Citation Reports, the journal's 2020 impact factor is 3.252.

Abstracting and indexing
Brain Research is abstracted and indexed in:

External links

References

Neuroscience journals
Elsevier academic journals
English-language journals
Journals more frequent than weekly
Publications established in 1966